Alfred Victor Espinas (23 May 1844 – 24 February 1922) was a French thinker noted for having been an influence on Nietzsche. He was a student of Comte and Spencer. Although initially an adherent of positivism, he later became a committed realist.

He died in Saint-Florentin, Yonne.

Works 
 Des sociétés animales (1877)
 Les origines de la technologie (1897)
 La philosophie sociale du XVIIIe siècle et la Révolution (1898)
 Descartes et la morale: Études sur l'histoire de la philosophie de l'action (1925)

References
Jean Ostrowski, Alfred Espinas, précurseur de la praxéologie: Ses antécédents et ses successeurs, Librairie Générale de Droit et de Jurisprudence, Paris, 1973

External links

French philosophers
French sociologists
1844 births
1922 deaths
French male non-fiction writers
Members of the Académie des sciences morales et politiques
English–French translators
École Normale Supérieure alumni
People from Yonne